The Department of Information (DOI) was an Australian Government department formed during World War II.

The department was established in September 1939 under the leadership of John Treloar, the director of the Australian War Memorial, who remained in the role of departmental secretary until early 1941. It was the first of 17 new Australian Government departments to be established during the war, and was responsible for both censorship and disseminating government propaganda. The department was based in Melbourne throughout its existence, though it established divisions in Sydney and bureaus in New York City and London. The DOI was broken up in 1950, with its functions being allocated between other departments.

Henry Gullett was the first Minister for Information.

The Australian News and Information Bureau (ANIB) was created within the DOI in 1940, based in New York City, with the main goal of informing the United States of Australia's war effort, thereby nurturing and building the relationship between the two countries. The agency later evolved into the Australian Information Service, eventually becoming part of DFAT.

Ministers for Information

Notes

References and further reading

 

Information
Ministries established in 1939
1939 establishments in Australia
1950 disestablishments in Australia